The 20th Hollywood Film Awards were held on November 6, 2016. The ceremony took place at The Beverly Hilton Hotel in Santa Monica, California.

Winners
Hollywood Career Achievement Award Eddie Murphy
Hollywood Actor Award Tom Hanks – Sully
Hollywood Supporting Actor Award Hugh Grant – Florence Foster Jenkins
Hollywood Actress Award Natalie Portman – Jackie
Hollywood Supporting Actress Award Nicole Kidman – Lion
Hollywood Comedy Award Robert De Niro – The Comedian
Hollywood Breakout Actress Award Naomie Harris – Collateral Beauty, Moonlight
New Hollywood Award Lily Collins – Rules Don't Apply
Spotlight Award Janelle Monáe – Hidden Figures
Hollywood Ensemble Award Bryce Dallas Howard, Stacy Keach, Matthew McConaughey, and Édgar Ramírez – Gold
Hollywood Song Award Justin Timberlake – "Can't Stop the Feeling!" from the Trolls soundtrack
Hollywood Documentary Award Leonardo DiCaprio and Fisher Stevens – Before the Flood
Hollywood Blockbuster Award The Jungle Book
Hollywood Animation Award Zootopia
Hollywood Director Award Mel Gibson – Hacksaw Ridge
Hollywood Breakthrough Director Award Tom Ford – Nocturnal Animals
Hollywood Producer Award Marc Platt – Billy Lynn's Long Halftime Walk, The Girl on the Train, and La La Land
Hollywood Screenwriter Award Kenneth Lonergan – Manchester by the Sea
Hollywood Cinematography Award Linus Sandgren – La La Land
Hollywood Film Composer Award Mychael Danna – Billy Lynn's Long Halftime Walk, Storks
Hollywood Editor Award John Gilbert – Hacksaw Ridge
Hollywood Visual Effects Award Stephane Ceretti and Richard Bluff – Doctor Strange
Hollywood Sound Award Christopher Boyes and Frank E. Eulner – The Jungle Book
Hollywood Costume Design Award Albert Wolsky – Rules Don't Apply
Hollywood Make-Up & Hair Styling Award Angela Conte, Bec Taylor, Shane Thomas, and Noriko Waztanabe – Hacksaw Ridge
Hollywood Production Design Award Wynn Thomas – Hidden Figures

References

External links
 

Hollywood
2016 in California
Hollywood Film Awards
2016 in American cinema